Lynette Wood is the Acting High Commissioner and Chargé d’Affaires to the Australian High Commission in the United Kingdom since May 2022. She held the position of Australian Ambassador to Switzerland, Germany and Liechtenstein from September 2016 to 2020. She succeeded David Ritchie and was replaced by Philip Green. In May 2022, Wood was appointed as Acting Australian High Commissioner to the United Kingdom. In September 2022, it was announced that Stephen Smith would succeed Wood as High Commissioner.

Wood graduated with a Master of Arts (International Relations) from the Australian National University, a Graduate Diploma in Foreign Affairs and Trade from Monash University, and a Bachelor of Arts (Honours) from the University of Sydney.

References

Ambassadors of Australia to Germany
Ambassadors of Australia to Switzerland
Ambassadors of Australia to Liechtenstein
High Commissioners of Australia to the United Kingdom
Australian women ambassadors
Year of birth missing (living people)
Living people
Monash University alumni
University of Sydney alumni